Dance Number (foaled March 28, 1979 in Kentucky) was an American Thoroughbred mare who retired having equaled or broken three track records for breeder and owner Ogden Phipps.

Racing career
Trained by U.S. Racing Hall of Fame inductee Angel Penna, Sr.,  on October 29, 1982 the three-year-old Dance Number equaled the Aqueduct Racetrack track record for 6½ furlongs on dirt in the High Voltage Stakes. As a three-year-old, on May 21, 1983, Dance Number won the Grade 2 Shuvee Handicap with another track record equaling run, this time at a mile and 1/16 on dirt.
 Then, on August 16, she set a new Beldame Stakes record for the Grade 1 event with a time of 2:00 3/5 for a mile and a quarter on dirt.

Broodmare career
Retired to broodmare duty, Dance Number produced six runners the most important of which was Rhythm who won the 1989 Breeders' Cup Juvenile and who was voted the Eclipse Award as the American Champion Two-Year-Old Colt.

Pedigree

References

1979 racehorse births
Racehorses bred in Kentucky
Racehorses trained in the United States
American Grade 1 Stakes winners
Phipps family
Thoroughbred family 1-x